Sebastiano Flori (active 1545) was an Italian painter active in Rome and Umbria. Sebastiano was a pupil of Giorgio Vasari and he painted with him in the large frescoes in the Palazzo della Cancelleria in Rome. He also frescoed in the church of San Francesco, Terni.

Gallery

References

16th-century Italian painters
Italian male painters
Mannerist painters
Umbrian painters